Arnoldius flavus is a species of ant of the genus Arnoldius, one of only three species described in it. Native to Australia, it was described by Crawley in 1922.

References

External links

Dolichoderinae
Hymenoptera of Australia
Insects described in 1922